Primates is a bimonthly peer-reviewed scientific journal of primatology, and an official journal of the Japan Monkey Center at Kyoto University. It publishes original papers that cover all aspects of the study of primates. The journal publishes original research articles, reviews, news and perspectives, and book reviews. It was established in 1957 by Kinji Imanishi. Although the first volume contained both articles in Japanese or English, subsequent volumes were published in English, thanks to a grant from the Rockefeller Foundation. It is now published by Springer and the current editor-in-chief is Masayuki Nakamichi (Osaka University).

According to the Journal Citation Reports, the journal has a 2020 impact factor of 2.163.

Abstracting and indexing 
The journal is abstracted and indexed by

References

External links 
 

Primatology journals
Bimonthly journals
English-language journals
Publications established in 1957
Springer Science+Business Media academic journals